Voter suppression is a strategy used to influence the outcome of an election by discouraging or preventing specific groups of people from voting. It is distinguished from political campaigning in that campaigning attempts to change likely voting behavior by changing the opinions of potential voters through persuasion and organization, activating otherwise inactive voters, or registering new supporters. Voter suppression, instead, attempts to gain an advantage by reducing the turnout of certain voters. Suppression is an anti-democratic tactic associated with authoritarianism. Some argue the term 'voter suppression' downplays the harm done when voices aren't reflected in an election, calling for terms like 'vote destruction' that accounts for the permanence of each vote not being cast.

The tactics of voter suppression range from changes that make voting more confusing or time-intensive, to intimidating or harming prospective voters.

Examples of modern voter suppression 
Making it harder to vote for people who have been given the right, skewing the electorate. This leads to worse outcomes as the wisdom of the crowd generally leads to better decision-making. Suppression does not require intent. Analyzing the turnout of eligible voters provides a common way to study cumulative voter suppression impacts under a particular set of conditions, though other avenues such as election subversion, gerrymandering, and corruption, can't always be captured by voter turnout metrics. Additionally, some of the rules that work to suppress votes can also be used as a pretext for throwing them out, regardless of how trivial or cynical the initial rule is. A 5-year U.S. Justice Department initiative to find voter fraud convicted less than 100 individuals in a country with over 150 million voters (or less than 1 in a million voters).

Ballot design 
A half-million Americans had their votes disqualified in 2008 and 2010 due to ballot design issues, including confusing instructions. The order of politicans on the ballot can also give one candidate an edge, while the length of a ballot can overwhelm many voters, pushing them from the electorate for some or all races and increasing the wait times in lines for in-person voters.

Corruption 
Corruption (legal and otherwise), reduces the influence of every vote by giving more power to wealthy people, special interests and lobbyists, leading to direct or indirect forms of election subversion. This includes buying votes directly or indirectly from voters.

Day-of experience 
Requiring people to travel long distances and/or wait in long lines, for example suppresses voter turnout. In contrast, having the option to vote by mail, for example, helps to enfranchise many people, including those who can't get off of work or have difficulty traveling to cast their ballots. 78% of citizens preferred vote-by-mail in one survey. The Cost of Voting Index estimates how much more difficult the voting experience is on average in states around the U.S.

Disenfranchisement 
The disenfranchisement of voters due to age, citizenship, or criminal record are among the more recent examples of ways that elections can be subverted by changing who is allowed to vote. For example, 16-17 year-olds can't vote in most parts of the world. Some democracies remove voting rights for some long-term prisoners, but the U.S. remains the only democracy to allow many states to bar citizens from voting for life for past criminal offenses (felonies) despite evidence that voting reduces the risk of reoffending (a vestige of Jim Crow laws designed to keep black people from voting). Even when Floridians voted to overturn such an usual policy in 2018, the state legislature passed a law requiring all outstanding fines and fees be paid first before being eligible to vote, amounting to a modern-day poll tax. The debate over who should have a say extends to people on the path towards citizenship among other groups who may not be eligible to vote. Partial or full disenfranchisement of voters, like voter suppression, narrows the decision-makers to those using these autocratic tactics to grow their power.

1996 law banning non-citizens from voting in federal elections. 38 states have at one point allowed non-citizens to vote. Al Gore would've been president had Floridans not banned felons from voting.

Duty to vote 
Having voting as optional, for example, weakens the cultural norms around voting by not elevating it to greater importance. Peer pressure and a sense of belonging are powerful incentives to do something collectively. A voting culture can grow with, for example, universal voting, reinforcing how voting is valued, expected and a centerpiece of a place's culture. Australia found that during an election that was optional around gay marriage (unlike most other elections there), voter turnout still reached 80%.

Modern proposals include requiring that every selection have a 'none of the above' option, allow a wide range of valid excuses for not voting including for conscientious objectors and charging a low, non-compounding, non-criminal fee for those who don't vote or select a valid reason.

Election Day 
Weekend (such as Sunday voting in Australia), also contributes to higher turnout than weekday voting, maybe even more than having Election Day as a federally recognized holiday.

Election frequency 
Two round elections (including primary elections), recall elections, and off-year elections are some examples of elections that increase the amount of time and attention required of voters, typically leading to lower turnout among certain types of voters. For example, Japan, Switzerland and the United States have among the lowest turnout rates of developed countries thanks to the federalism that contributes to them having a more complicated political system with more elections.

Election subversion 
Some examples of election subversion include denying the legitimacy of elections, disqualifying votes, permitting election insecurity and manipulation, and the intimidation of election officials.

Identification 
The requirement to have a photo identification in order to vote can disenfranchise many voters especially the young, elderly, lower-income people, recently transitioned individuals, people of color, recently married women and people with disabilities, with one Brennan Center estimate that 11% of Americans did not have the type of photo id recently required by many states. A solution implemented in a number of countries is to automatically send id cards to all its citizens for free. Additionally, the implementation of signature-matching processes, especially for mail-in ballots, can also be done so strictly as to suppress orders of magnitude more votes than the actual fraud that it prevents.

Information warfare 
Misinformation, disinformation, and the platforms that incentivized to boost half-truths and lies are forms of information warfare that can be used to confuse, intimidate, or deceive voters. When misinformation and disinformation is amplified by the laundering of foreign money through domestic nonprofit organizations or other allied domestic actors, charges of treason can be brought against these actors for colluding with a foreign power.

Common examples include undermining journalism, academia, political speech and other fundamental exchanges of ideas and information. Free or low-cost sources of information, such as through libraries, schools, nonprofits, public media, or open-source projects (like Wikipedia), have historically supported this key democratic prerequisite. For example, two-thirds of U.S. college students cited a lack of information as a reason for why they didn't vote.

Intimidation and/or violence 
Intimidation can result from the presence of cameras or guns at polling places to ballots that may not be secret. Following-through on threats by physically harming or killing people can severely deter voter participation.

Party membership requirements 
Another example where registration can suppress votes is requiring a declared party preference, which is required in closed primaries in the United States for example, dissuading voters who do not want to declare a party preference in order to weigh-in on who represents them. Open primaries allow anyone to vote regardless of party preference or affiliation. In more extreme (of more authoritarian) systems, loyal party membership may be required to have a say, or even basic rights and privileges, in certain political systems.

Path dependence/tyranny of the past 
The lack of intergenerational equity in policy undermines the ability of voters to pursue self-determination through their democratic processes. For example, the lifetime appointments of judges, or constitutions that are so difficult to change that they do not reflect the values of current voters, show how power allocated in the past can thwart voter power in the present. This kind of lock-in is only helpful if the present is less democratic than the past, which can become a self-fulfilling prophecy by simultaneously hampering the democratic innovations and evolutions that could prevent those threats by bolstering ancient architecture with the latest best-practices. Past actions can also create other kinds of path dependence, where power to shape democratic institutions can be slowed down or subverted by decisions made by those who wielded power in the past, regardless of how fairly (democratically) those setting the rules came to power and regardless of the values held by or information available to voters in the present. A relatively tangible example could be a country allowing itself to run up a large national debt that present-day voters did not consent to, shrinking discretionary spending to a fraction of what previous voters were able to spend.

Registration/Enrollment 
Voter registration (or enrollment) is an extra step in the election process creates extra work for voters, especially those who move often and are new to the system, thereby suppressing their votes. It is the number one reason why citizens in the U.S. don't vote, which is why most democracies automatically enroll their citizens. Same-day registration is another tool to make registration less of a barrier. In addition, the existence of the process itself opens up more opportunities to make the process intentionally difficult or impossible, including aggressive voter roll purges. The Cost of Voting Index quantifies how different voter registration experiences are in states around the U.S.

Votes count differently between jurisdictions 
All votes should count the same, but unlike in systems with proportional representation, winner-take-all geographic-based representation are especially vulnerable to weakening and wasting certain votes year after year, especially in the U.S. where gerrymandering is still allowed. This phenomenon also suppresses turnout for that and other elections help simultaneously in states that are not competitive, suppressing the popular vote for president in the U.S., for example, while lowering turnout in a host of other contests. In contrast, a parliamentary system typically significantly reduces wasted (suppressed) votes, helping to ensure more vote equality and encouraging greater overall participation.

Ballot referendum can also be a powerful avenue for changing political systems, for example, that are not as responsive to voters due to gerrymandering or other anti-democratic actions and policies.

By Country

Australia
Australian citizens are expected to enroll to vote, and it is their responsibility to update their enrollment when they change their address. Even so, an estimated 6% of eligible Australian voters are not enrolled or are enrolled incorrectly. They are disproportionately younger voters, many of whom might neglect to enroll when they attain voting age.

In 2006, the Howard government legislated to close the electoral roll much earlier once an election was called than before. Previously, voters had been allowed seven days of grace after an election had been called to arrange or update their enrollment, but new voters were now allowed only until 8:00 p.m. on the day that the electoral writ was issued to lodge their enrollment form, and those who needed to update their addresses were allowed three days. In Australia, the Prime Minister effectively has the right to determine the date of the election as long as constitutional rules regarding the maximum term of the parliament are adhered to. That measure was therefore likely to result in many newer voters being precluded from voting in the first election for which they were eligible because the time to arrange their enrollment once an election is called had been greatly reduced.

The measure was widely seen as an attempt at voter suppression aimed at younger voters since surveys had shown that younger voters are more likely than the general population to vote for the Australian Labor Party or the Greens than Howard's Liberal Party. The government denied that it was trying to suppress some voters and insisted that the purposes of the reform were a smoother administration of the elections and the reduction of the possibility of electoral fraud. However, the Australian Electoral Commission had requested no such reform, there had been no evidence of significant electoral fraud, and the Australian Electoral Commission had been dealing with hundreds of thousands of late enrollments without significant problems for decades.

In July 2010, the left-wing lobby group GetUp! launched a challenge to the law. The High Court of Australia expedited the hearing so that a ruling could be made in time for the 2010 federal election. The majority ruling struck down early closing of the roll and reinstated the old rule allowing voters seven days grace to arrange or update their enrollment.

Brazil 

In the 2022 Brazilian general election, there were attempts by police and political sympathisers to make it more difficult for lower-income people to attend polling stations. Some public transport services were temporary reduced, spot inspections of vehicles and public transport were increased in poorer areas of the country, and roadblocks set up to disrupt and delay traffic.

Canada 
Shortly before the 2011 Canadian federal election, voter suppression tactics were exercised by issuing robocalls and live calls, which falsely advised voters that their polling station had been changed. The locations offered by those messages were intentionally false, often led voters several hours from the correct stations, and often identified themselves illegally as coming from Elections Canada. In litigation brought by the Council of Canadians, a federal court found that such fraud had occurred and had probably been perpetrated by someone with access to the Conservative Party's voter database, including its information about voter preferences. The court stated that the evidence did not prove that the Conservative Party or that its successful candidates had been directly involved, but it criticized the Conservative Party for making "little effort to assist with the investigation." The court did not annul the result in any of six ridings where the fraud had occurred because it concluded that the number of votes affected had been too small to change the outcome.

France 
In France, as in some other countries with Voter Registration, requirements and processes to update your address suppress voter turnout disproportionately against people who move more often, who tend to be younger, for example.

Israel 
In April 2019, during Israel's general elections for the 21st Knesset, Likud activists installed hidden cameras in polling stations in Arab communities. Election observers were seen wearing such cameras. Hanan Melcer, the Head of the General Elections Committee, called the cameras illegal. The following day, the public relations agency Kaizler Inbar took credit for the operation and said it had been planned in collaboration with Likud. It claimed that voter turnout in Arab communities had fallen under 50% by the presence of the agency's observers in the polling stations, though some of this decrease is likely due to a boycott that was planned for the vote.

United Kingdom
Lutfur Rahman was the directly-elected mayor of Tower Hamlets for the British Labour Party. He was removed from office after being convicted of breaches of electoral law when his supporters intimidated voters at polling stations.

United States

In the United States, elections are administered locally (though with many election rules set by states and the federal government), and forms of voter suppression vary among jurisdictions. When the country was founded, the right to vote in most states was limited to property-owning white males. Over time, the right to vote was granted to racial minorities, women, and youth.

In the late 19th and the early 20th centuries, Southern states passed Jim Crow laws to suppress poor and racial minority voters that involved poll taxes, literacy tests, and grandfather clauses. Most of those voter suppression tactics were made illegal after the enactment of the Voting Rights Act of 1965. Even after the repeal of those statutes, there have been repetited incidents of racial discrimination against voters, especially in the South. For example, 87,000 people in Georgia were unable to vote in 2018 because of late registration. Many of the strictest voting regulations are in swing states and have been enacted primarily by U.S. Republican Party politicians. According to AMP Reports, many people who were predicted to be in favor of voting for the U.S. Democratic Party had their ballot dismissed. The study's analysis noted, "A disproportionate number of those potential voters were people of color or young voters, groups that typically favor Democrats." The history of the previous Jim Crow regulations in the Southern states affects the voter suppression today because minorities often have their vote dismissed by the manipulation of voting regulations.

One analysis of a Florida election in 2012 found that 200,000+ people didn't vote because of long lines. Some Floridians waited 6–7 hours.

In 2013, voter ID laws arose after the U.S. Supreme Court struck down Section 4 of the Voting Rights Act. Some argue that such laws amount to voter suppression against African-Americans.

In Texas, a voter ID law requiring a driver's license, passport, military identification, or gun permit was repeatedly found to be intentionally discriminatory. The state's election laws could be put back under the control of the U.S. Department of Justice. Under Attorney General Jeff Sessions, however, the DOJ expressed support for Texas's ID law. Sessions was accused by Coretta Scott King in 1986 of trying to suppress the black vote. A similar ID law in North Dakota, which would have disenfranchised many Native Americans, was also overturned.

In Wisconsin, a federal judge found that the state's restrictive voter ID law had led to "real incidents of disenfranchisement, which undermine rather than enhance confidence in elections, particularly in minority communities." Since there was no evidence of widespread voter impersonation in Wisconsin, it found that the law was "a cure worse than the disease." In addition to imposing strict voter ID requirements, the law reduced early voting, required people to live in a ward for at least 28 days before voting, and prohibited emailing absentee ballots to voters.

Other controversial measures include shutting down Department of Motor Vehicles (DMV) offices in minority neighborhoods, which makes it more difficult for residents to obtain voter IDs; shutting down polling places in minority neighborhoods; systematically depriving precincts in minority neighborhoods of the resources needed to operate efficiently, such as poll workers and voting machines; and purging voters from the rolls shortly before an election.

Often, voter fraud is cited as a justification for such laws even if the incidence is low. In Iowa, lawmakers passed a strict voter ID law with the potential to disenfranchise 260,000 voters. Out of 1.6 million votes cast in Iowa in 2016, there were only 10 allegations of voter fraud, none of which being cases of impersonation that a voter ID law could have prevented. Iowa Secretary of State Paul Pate, the architect of the bill, admitted, "We've not experienced widespread voter fraud in Iowa."

In May 2017, U.S. President Donald Trump established the Presidential Advisory Commission on Election Integrity for the purpose of preventing voter fraud. Critics have suggested its true purpose is voter suppression. The commission was led by Kansas Secretary of State Kris Kobach, a staunch advocate of strict voter ID laws and a proponent of the Crosscheck system. Crosscheck is a national database, which is designed to check for voters who are registered in more than one state by comparing names and dates of birth. Researchers at Stanford University, the University of Pennsylvania, Harvard University, and Microsoft found that for every legitimate instance of double registration it finds, Crosscheck's algorithm returns approximately 200 false positives. Kobach has been repeatedly sued by the American Civil Liberties Union (ACLU) for trying to restrict voting rights in Kansas.

See also

 Authoritarianism
 Democratization
 Electoral fraud
 Fascism
 Gerrymandering
 Political corruption
 Unfair election
 Vote equality
 Voter caging
 Voter registration
 Voter turnout

Further reading

 Rick L. Hasen. 2020. Election Meltdown: Dirty Tricks, Distrust, and the Threat to American Democracy. Yale University Press.

References

External links
  

 
Political campaign techniques
Political corruption
Electoral fraud
Discrimination
Injustice